Barry Blake, born 1937, is an Australian linguist, specializing in the description of Australian Aboriginal languages. He is a professor emeritus at La Trobe University Melbourne.

Career
Blake was born in the northern Melbourne suburb of Ascot Vale. His father was an accomplished speaker of rhyming slang, and Blake was raised listening to talks in which a priest would be called 'cream and yeast', nuns 'currant buns' and being drunk ('pissed') 'Brahms and Liszt'. After graduating from Melbourne University with an honours degree in Latin and English, he worked as a secondary schoolteacher before joining the Australian Department of Defence where he worked as a language instructor. In 1966, he became a research fellow at the Australian Institute of Aboriginal Studies at Monash University and began to undertake field research and analysis of three moribund three indigenous languages, Kalkatungu, once spoken around Mount Isa in central Queensland and which was the basis for his M.A.thesis (1968), Pitta Pitta and Yalarnnga. He obtained his PhD at Monash in 1975.

He was elected fellow of the Australian Academy of the Humanities in 1987, and in the following year was appointed to the Foundation Chair in linguistics at La Trobe University. He has recently reconstructed aspects of the extinct dialects of the Kulin languages from fragmentary evidence retrieved from various ethnographic reports made in the 19th century.

Theoretical work
Blake's theoretical work has made a decisive contribution to the long-standing debate over whether the observed distinction between the Pama-Nyungan languages and non-Pama-Nyungan languages of Australia was genetic or typological. Robert M. W. Dixon had reconstructed the elements of the proto-Australian pronoun system, and Blake did similar work for the non-Pama-Nyungan languages, showing that their verb pronominal prefix forms may well have descended from a single proto-language, with a distinct set of proto-pronouns, the implication being that there were two distinct proto-languages in the Australian continent.

His linguistic interests have extended beyond Australia, in work on south East Asian languages where he has shown that the phenomenon of ergativity is much more widespread than had previously been thought. He has done pioneering studies in the field of linguistic typology and case-marking systems. For example, he developed the hierarchy of cases.

Selected works
 (1981) with Graham Mallinson, Language Typology:Cross-linguistic Studies in Syntax. North-Holland Publishing 978-0-444-86311-9
 (1987) Australian Aboriginal Grammar, Croom Helm 
 (1994) Case. Cambridge University Press (reprint 2001) 
 (2010) Secret Language. Oxford University Press 

 (2003) 
 (2007) Playing with Words: Humour in the English Language.Equinox Publishing

Notes and references

Notes

References

1937 births
Linguists from Australia
Linguists of Australian Aboriginal languages
Linguists of Pama–Nyungan languages
Living people